Castle on the Hudson (UK title: Years Without Days) is a 1940 American film noir drama directed by Anatole Litvak and starring John Garfield, Ann Sheridan, and Pat O'Brien. A thief is sent to Sing Sing Prison, where he is befriended by the reform-minded warden. The film was based on the book Twenty Thousand Years in Sing Sing, written by Lewis E. Lawes, on whom the warden (played by O'Brien) in the film was based. Castle on the Hudson was actually a remake of an earlier Spencer Tracy prison film, 20,000 Years in Sing Sing (1932), also based on Lawes's book.

Plot
Tommy Gordan (John Garfield), a cocky, arrogant career thief, is finally nailed by New York City authorities after pulling a big heist. He is sentenced to a minimum seven years at the state prison in Ossining, aka Sing Sing, on the shores of the Hudson River. There, he meets prison warden Walter Long (Pat O'Brien), to whom he takes an immediate dislike. Months later, inmate Tommy settles into the dull routine of prison life.

There is one rule that the superstitious Tommy Gordon has always obeyed—never pull a job on a Saturday. So when fellow inmate Steve Rockford (Burgess Meredith) invites Tommy to assist him in a breakout, he at first agrees. Later however, learning that Rockford has scheduled the escape for a Saturday night, he backs out. Sure enough, Rockford's plans go awry, and he dies during the attempt. Afterwards, Warden Long learns of Tommy's refusal to collaborate with Rockford. So later, when he receives news that Tommy's girlfriend, Kay Manners (Ann Sheridan), is seriously ill, he offers Tommy temporary unsupervised parole, just long enough to visit Kay. Despite the parole's taking place on a Saturday, Tommy gratefully accedes.

Once in New York, however, Tommy becomes embroiled in an altercation involving his shyster lawyer Ed Crowley (Jerome Cowan), who is shot dead by a sick, convalescing Kay. Though he is actually innocent of the crime, Tommy decides to protect Kay's reputation by taking the blame for his lawyer's death. So upon returning to Sing Sing, he greets the warden with a fake confession. A courtroom trial follows, where despite Kay's attempts to explain she is the real murderer, Tommy is convicted and sentenced to the electric chair. Unlike many of his death-row companions who panic and break down as their appointment with fate approaches, Tommy stolidly faces the consequences of his noble decision. In the end, he slowly walks that last mile before execution, accompanied by a solemn Warden Long and the prison chaplain.

Cast
 John Garfield as Tommy Gordan
 Ann Sheridan as Kay Manners, his girlfriend
 Pat O'Brien as Warden Walter Long
 Burgess Meredith as Steve Rockford
 Henry O'Neill as District Attorney
 Jerome Cowan as Ed Crowley
 Guinn "Big Boy" Williams as Mike Kagel
 John Litel as Prison Chaplain
 Margot Stevenson as Ann Rockford
 Willard Robertson as Detective Ragan
 Edward Pawley as Black Jack
 Billy Wayne as Pete
 Nedda Harrigan as Mrs. Long
 Wade Boteler as Principal Keeper
 Barbara Pepper as Goldie
 Robert Strange as Joe Morris
 William Hopper as Reporter (uncredited)
 Grant Mitchell as Psychologist Dr. Ames (uncredited)
 Frank Puglia as Tony, prisoner on Death Row (uncredited)
 Adrian Morris as Prisoner (uncredited)

Production notes
A year earlier, John Garfield had refused to play a role in Invisible Stripes (1939) as George Raft's younger brother, and this had forced Warner Brothers to place the actor on the first of 11 total suspensions while at the studio. It was only after Warners agreed to allow Garfield to play the lead role in a film based on Maxwell Anderson's 1927 play Saturday's Children that Garfield agreed to first act in Castle.

Before shooting commenced, John Garfield made two demands. First, he stipulated that the original ending, where his character dies in the electric chair for a crime he did not commit, be retained in the movie's script. Second, to seal the deal, Garfield pressed for a $10,000 bonus. Warners agreed to both demands.

The week the film opened in New York City, Garfield guest-starred on the popular NBC network radio program, Cavalcade of America. The March 5, 1940, broadcast promoted his work in a new play, Albert Bein's Heavenly Express, but made no mention of the just-released Castle on the Hudson. Ironically, Bein's play closed after only 20 performances, but Castle became a resounding commercial success.

Critical reaction
An unsigned critique in The New York Times, published during Castle on the Hudson's premiere March 1940 engagement, praised the cast as being "so good that a player like Burgess Meredith appears satisfied with fourth billing." The reviewer, however, panned the stock characters they played, complaining that "you have met them all before, and whether you care to renew the acquaintance or not, here is an excellent opportunity."

According to one of John Garfield's biographers, the actor was disappointed that "the critics did not think more highly of the film or his performance." Further, it seemed he was continually trying to "prove that he had far more range as an actor" than Warners allowed him to demonstrate. So when the studio assigned him another shallow tough-guy role in Flight Angels (1940), he rejected it and, for the second time, was placed on suspension.

In 1977, the Greater Ossining Arts Council featured a film festival under the title of Stars in Stripes Forever. The movies selected for showing were those that were either filmed at or set in Ossining (Sing Sing) Prison. Besides paying tribute to Castle on the Hudson, the festival also saluted such features as Invisible Stripes (1939), Each Dawn I Die (1939), and 20,000 Years in Sing Sing (1932).

See also
 List of American films of 1940
 20,000 Years in Sing Sing, an earlier film also based on the Lawes book.

External links

References

1940 films
1940 crime drama films
American black-and-white films
American crime drama films
American prison drama films
1940s English-language films
Films based on non-fiction books
Films directed by Anatole Litvak
Films produced by Samuel Bischoff
Films scored by Adolph Deutsch
Films set in New York (state)
Warner Bros. films
1940s American films